Ruxmaniben Deepchand Gardi Medical College is the first private medical college in Madhya Pradesh state of India. It is situated in Ujjain city. In 2001, RDGMC came in existence after a long waiting period of nearly forty years. The college is a unit of the Ujjain Charitable Trust Hospital, a 400 bedded multi speciality hospital situated in Ujjain City. RDGMC is associated with the CR Gardi Hospital, situated in the Medical College Campus where all the services are provided free.

Admissions
The college has an annual intake of 150 undergraduate candidates for MBBS and 50 postgraduate candidates for MD/MS/Diplomas.

Currently admissions are permitted mainly for students who appeared in National Eligibility cum Entrance Test or NEET conducted via National Testing Agency (NTA) and qualified the exam.

References

External links
 

Medical colleges in Madhya Pradesh
Universities and colleges in Madhya Pradesh
Educational institutions established in 2001
2001 establishments in Madhya Pradesh
Vikram University
Buildings and structures in Ujjain